The second season of the Indian television courtroom drama series Adaalat, premiered on 4 June 2016 on Sony TV. The show aired on Saturday and Sunday. Produced by Contiloe Entertainment, Ronit Roy reprised his character from the previous season. Sameer Dharmadhikari, Rakshanda Khan and a host of actors in recurring roles. The execution style and the sets of the show was more grand and matched international standards this season.

Plot
Adaalat season 2 is a one-hour courtroom drama series which follows the life of city’s most famous defence advocate K.D. Pathak, who is known to have never lost a case. The one-hour show unravels how the suave, sophisticated, witty and unconventional lawyer with an eye for details turns the table in his clients favour and wins them freedom. But what K.D. most importantly fights for is not his clients but for true justice. His name K.D. have certain meaning which was hidden from audience.

Cast
 Ronit Roy as Advocate K.D. Pathak
 Tithi Raaj as Adhira Sharma (K.D.'s assistant)

Recurring roles
Anand Goradia as Public Prosecutor Indrajit Mohan Jaiswal
 Pankaj B. Singh as Inspector R. S. Rathore
 Niloufer as Mrs. Billimoria
 Rakshanda Khan as Public Prosecutor Pratigya Verma
 Shikha Singh as Public Prosecutor Anjali Puri
 Kishwer Merchant as News Reader Devika
 Gaurav Chopra as prosecutor Vishwajeet Ranawat

Episodic appearances

 Sameer Dharmadhikari as Public Prosecutor Subhash Gujral
 Ashwini Kalsekar as Public Prosecutor Amrita Kothare
 Deepraj Rana as Public Prosecutor Digvijay Chauhan
 Vedita Pratap Singh as Sonika Malhotra
 Akshay Sethi as Manas Shinde
 Anshul Trivedi as Viren Kumar
 Sareeka Dhillon as Rinku Solanki
 Yash Pandit as Aarav Sharma
 Amit Tandon as Monty Khanna
 Ojaswi Oberoi as Renuka Jhulka
 Sanjeev Siddharth as B. Shetty
 Mandar Jadhav as Rumi Dastoor
 Tiya Gandwani as Mrs. Dastoor
 Jiten Mukhi as Mukesh "Mike" Bhullar
 Nidhi Jha as Pragya Parekh
 Vikas Grover as Chinmayee
 Yogesh Mahajan as Swami Satyanand
 Neetha Shetty as Kalpana Mishra
 Prithvi Zutshi as Mansoor Maalik

References

2016 Indian television seasons
Sony Entertainment Television original programming